Eino Olkinuora (11 November 1915 in Kaukola – 20 October 1941) was a Finnish cross-country skier who competed in the 1930s. He won a gold medal in the 4 × 10 km relay at the 1939 FIS Nordic World Ski Championships in Zakopane.

Olkinuora was killed in action in Gavrilovkaja during World War II on 20 October 1941.

Cross-country skiing results

World Championships
 1 medal – (1 gold)

External links
World Championship results 

1915 births
1941 deaths
People from Priozersky District
People from Viipuri Province (Grand Duchy of Finland)
Finnish male cross-country skiers
Finnish military personnel killed in World War II
FIS Nordic World Ski Championships medalists in cross-country skiing